The following lists events that happened during 1896 in New Zealand.

Incumbents

Regal and viceregal
Head of State – Queen Victoria
Governor – David Boyle, 7th Earl of Glasgow

Government and law
The Liberal Party is re-elected and begins the 13th New Zealand Parliament.

Speaker of the House – Sir Maurice O'Rorke
Prime Minister – Richard Seddon
Minister of Finance – Joseph Ward resigns on 16 June and is replaced by Richard Seddon
Chief Justice – Hon Sir James Prendergast
The Female Law Practitioners Act was passed in 1896, and Ethel Benjamin who had graduated in law from the University of Otago in 1896 was admitted as a barrister and solicitor of the Supreme Court of New Zealand in 1897.

Parliamentary opposition
Leader of the Opposition –  William Russell.

Main centre leaders
Mayor of Auckland – James Holland followed by Abraham Boardman
Mayor of Christchurch – Walter Cooper followed by Harry Joseph Beswick
Mayor of Dunedin – Nathaniel Wales followed by Hugh Gourley
Mayor of Wellington – George Fisher

Events 
 26 March: Brunner Mine disaster; 65 miners killed in explosion
 13 April: National Council of Women of New Zealand is founded, with Kate Sheppard as its first president.
 13 October: First public screening of a motion picture in New Zealand, in Auckland.
 4 December: 1896 New Zealand general election.

Undated

 Census measures national population as 743,214.
 The government increases the New Zealand head tax to £100 per head, and tightens the other restriction to only one Chinese immigrant for every 200 tons of cargo.

Arts and literature

Music

Media
 The Waikato Argus starts publication. The newspaper runs until 1915.
The Gisborne Times is founded. It became a daily in 1901, and continued to publish until being bought out by The Poverty Bay Herald in 1938.
 July: The Waikato Times and Waikato Advocate merge, and the former moves to daily publication.

Sport

Athletics
National Champions, Men
100 yards – E. Robinson (Canterbury)
250 yards – W. Kingston (Otago)
440 yards – W. Low (Otago)
880 yards – W. Low (Otago)
1 mile – W. Bennett (Otago)
3 miles – W. Bennett (Otago)
120 yards hurdles – W. Martin (Auckland)
440 yards hurdles – J. Thomas Roberts (Auckland)
Long jump – Leonard Cuff (Canterbury)
High jump – P. Brown (Canterbury)
Pole vault – tie R. Hunter (Hawkes Bay) and H. Kingsley (Wanganui)
Shot put – W. Rhodes (Wellington)
Hammer throw – P. Brown (Canterbury)

Chess
National Champion: W. Meldrum of Rangitikei.

Cricket

Golf
Men's national amateur champion – M.S. Todd (Otago)
Women's national amateur champion – L. Wilford (Hutt)

Horse racing

Harness racing
 Auckland Trotting Cup (over 3 miles) is won by Fibre

Thoroughbred racing
 New Zealand Cup – Lady Zetland
 New Zealand Derby – Uniform
 Auckland Cup – Nestor
 Wellington Cup – Brooklet

Season leaders (1895/96)
Top New Zealand stakes earner – Euroclydon
Leading flat jockey – C. Jenkins

Lawn Bowls
National Champions
There are no national championships this year.

Polo
Savile Cup winners – Manawatu

Rowing
National Champions (Men)
Single sculls – C. Chapman (Wairewa)
Double sculls – Wairewa, Little River
Coxless pairs – Canterbury
Coxed fours – Queen's Dr, Port Chalmers

Rugby union

Shooting
Ballinger Belt – Sergeant Wakelyn (Honorary Reserve Corps, Christchurch)

Soccer
Provincial league champions:
	Auckland:	Auckland United
	Otago:	Roslyn Dunedin
	Wellington:	Wellington Swifts

Swimming
Not held

Tennis
National Championships
Men's singles – H. Parker
Women's singles – Kathleen Nunneley
Men's doubles – Richard Harman   and D. Collins
Women's doubles – Kathleen Nunneley and T. Trimmell

Births
 15 June (in England): Archie Fisher, painter.

Deaths
 18 May: Daniel Pollen, politician (born 1813) 
 2 August: James FitzGerald, politician (born 1818).
 28 August:James Hume,  medical doctor (born 1823).

See also
List of years in New Zealand
Timeline of New Zealand history
History of New Zealand
Military history of New Zealand
Timeline of the New Zealand environment
Timeline of New Zealand's links with Antarctica

References
General
 Romanos, J. (2001) New Zealand Sporting Records and Lists. Auckland: Hodder Moa Beckett. 
Specific

External links